Michael Joseph Hornung (June 12, 1857 – October 30, 1931) was an American baseball player and one of the greatest fielders of the 19th century. Michael Joseph Hornung was born in Carthage, New York in 1857.

Prior to starting his career in Major League Baseball in 1879 with the Buffalo Bisons, Hornung played for the 1877 and 1878 London Tecumsehs in London, Ontario, Canada, winning the International Association title in 1877.

Hornung ended his major league baseball career in 1890 with the New York Giants, but he spent most of his career (1881–1888) with the Boston Red Caps/Beaneaters. He also spent one season (1889) in the now-defunct American Association.  After umpiring for a few seasons in the minor leagues he took on the roll of player / manager for the Batavia Giants franchise on May 25, 1897, making his playing debut on June 14 at the age of 40, he went hitless.

He was remarkable for his nearly flawless play in left field and also known for his peculiar habit of shouting "ubbo ubbo" whenever he got a hit or made a good fielding play. Due to this peculiarity, "Ubbo Ubbo" became Hornung's nickname.

In addition to being an exceptional fielder, Hornung was also a fast baserunner, stealing 39 bases in his final season, and was a fair hitter, batting .302 in 1882. He led all National League outfielders in fielding percentage in 1881, 1882, 1883 and 1886, fielding as high as .948, a very high mark for a time in which most players (including Hornung), didn't wear gloves in the field.  Hornung died in 1931 in Howard Beach, New York.

See also
 List of Major League Baseball annual runs scored leaders
 List of Major League Baseball career stolen bases leaders

References 

 Joe Hornung Statistics at Baseball-Reference.com
Baseball: The Biographical Encyclopedia
 Article about Hornung: "Homegrown Baseball Hero", Watertown Daily Times, June 27, 2010

1857 births
1931 deaths
New York Giants (NL) players
19th-century baseball players
Major League Baseball outfielders
Baseball players from New York (state)
Buffalo Bisons (NL) players
Boston Red Caps players
Boston Beaneaters players
Baltimore Orioles (NL) players
London Tecumseh players
Buffalo (minor league baseball) players
Buffalo Bisons (minor league) players
Providence Grays (minor league) players
Providence Clamdiggers (baseball) players
Worcester (minor league baseball) players
Atlanta Crackers players
Batavia Giants players
Geneva Alhambras players
People from Carthage, New York
Burials at Holy Cross Cemetery, Brooklyn